India Abroad is a weekly newspaper published from New York City, which focuses on Indian news meant for an Indian American, Indian diaspora and expatriate audience.  The publication is known for its annual award ceremony for the "India Abroad Person of the Year."

India Abroad was founded by Indian American publisher Gopal Raju in 1970. India Abroad calls itself "the oldest Indian newspaper published in North America." Under Raju's guidance, India Abroad quickly gained a reputation as one of the most credible, well-researched voices for the Indian American community. The Economist, a British weekly international affairs magazine, referred to India Abroad as a daily publication of “unusually high quality”.

Since 2002, the publication has been honoring Indian-American achievers at the annual India Abroad Person of the Year award ceremony.  The following are the list of winners.

Raju sold India Abroad to Rediff.com in April 2001, which as of 2009 owns and operates the paper.

Gopal Raju died in New York City on April 10, 2008.

In late 2016, Rediff.com sold its venture to 8K Miles Media, Inc.

On March 27, 2020, Chairman and publisher Suresh Venkatachari informed readers via his Publisher's Note that "India Abroad will cease its print publication at the end of March 2020. The last issue of India Abroad will be dated March 30."

References

External links
India Abroad

Asian-American press
Indian-American culture in New York City
Newspapers published in New York City
Publications established in 1970